The GreenTec Awards are an international environmental award based in Germany. Founded in 2008 by the Berlin-based consultancy VKP engineering GmbH, the prize honors projects, products, and people contributing to the protection of the environment. The GreenTec Awards were formerly known as the Clean Tech Media Awards.

In 2017, Canada was the partner country of the GreenTec Awards; Norway is official partner for 2019. In 2018, the GreenTec Awards opened the IFAT, the world's biggest trade fair for environmental technologies, for the third time.

Contest 
The GreenTec Awards are awarded annually in varying categories. Additionally, there are "Special Prizes".

Certification 
The competition of the GreenTec Awards is supervised by TÜV Nord in order to ensure fairness and transparency in the selection of the laureates. The award process received the certificate "Certified process of competition" by TÜV Nord.

Jury 
Currently, a 75-member jury with independent representatives from business, media, and science chooses two of the three finalists per category  –  the third finalist is determined via a public online voting. In an annual jury meeting, the top three projects are presented and discussed and the winners are chosen in a secret vote.

In 2013, the dual fluid nuclear reactor design won the public vote for the Galileo Knowledge Prize, but the award committee presiding over the awards changed the rules to exclude all nuclear designs before announcing the winner. The DFR participants successfully sued in response to this.

Award ceremony 
The GreenTec Awards are awarded at an annual gala event with 1000 guests from business and industry, science, politics, media, and showbiz. The event alternately takes place in Berlin and Munich and is organized in collaboration with partners from different social sectors, such as Fraunhofer, Wilo, and the Germany Association of the Automotive Industry (VDA). With music acts, media partners like Frankfurter Allgemeine Zeitung, WirtschaftsWoche and ProSieben, and a "Green Carpet", the GreenTec Awards seek to make the topic of environmental protection more appealing to the broad public.

Laureates

Former laureates (selection)

People 
 Dr. Auma Obama
 Bob Geldof (The Boomtown Rats)
 Clark Datchler (Johnny Hates Jazz)
 Elon Musk (Tesla)
 Morton Harket (A-ha)
 NENA
 Nico Rosberg (Formula One World Champion 2016)
 Rea Garvey

Projects and products 
 Alstom with the hydrogen train Coradia iLint
 BMW i8
 car2go
 Continental with dandelion rubber production
 JouleX
 Little Sun
 Showerloop
 Skysails

Current laureates 
In 2018, there were nine categories and three special prizes:

See also
 Bright green environmentalism
 Eco-innovation
 Ecological modernization
 Ecotechnology
 Environmental technology
 Green development
 List of environmental awards

References 

Environmental awards
Environmental technology
Annual events in Germany
Awards established in 2008